In algebra, the bicommutant of a subset S of a semigroup (such as an algebra or a group) is the commutant of the commutant of that subset. It is also known as the double commutant or second commutant and is written .

The bicommutant is particularly useful in operator theory, due to the von Neumann double commutant theorem, which relates the algebraic and analytic structures of operator algebras. Specifically, it shows that if M is a unital, self-adjoint operator algebra in the C*-algebra B(H), for some Hilbert space H, then the weak closure, strong closure and bicommutant of M are equal.

The bicommutant of S always contains S. So . On the other hand, . So , i.e. the commutant of the bicommutant of S is equal to the commutant of S. By induction, we have:

and

for n > 1.

It is clear that, if S1 and S2 are subsets of a semigroup, 

See also
 von Neumann double commutant theorem

References 
J. Dixmier, Von Neumann Algebras, North-Holland, Amsterdam, 1981.

Group theory